Julie Shea is a former American long-distance runner and politician.

Early life 
While at Gibbons High School in Raleigh, North Carolina, she was the first Track and Field News "High School Athlete of the Year" in 1977 Her national record for female high-school mile was unbroken until 2012, when Wesley Frazier beat it.

College career 
At her time at North Carolina State lead the cross country team to two national titles, won two individual cross country championships, and won 5 individual Track and Field titles.

While in track and field at North Carolina State she became, in 1980 and 1981, the only female athlete honored with the Anthony J. McKevlin Award noting athlete of the year in the Atlantic Coast Conference. (In 1990, the award began to be awarded only to male athletes and a separate award was started to honor women.)

In 1980, she won the Broderick Award (now the Honda Sports Award) as the nation's best female collegiate track and field athlete and the same award for cross country in 1981. In addition, she was awarded the Broderick Cup, given to the nation's best female collegiate athlete.

In 1993 Shea was inducted into the North Carolina Sports Hall of Fame and in 2012 she was part of the inaugural class of the NC State Athletic Hall of Fame.

Notable marathoning achievements
 All results regarding marathon, unless stated otherwise

Post college 
In the 1990s, Shea was thrice elected to Raleigh City Council. She currently coaches CoolKidsRun in Raleigh.

References

Raleigh City Council members
Track and field athletes from North Carolina
Living people
North Carolina State University alumni
Year of birth missing (living people)
Women city councillors in North Carolina
NC State Wolfpack women's track and field athletes
NC State Wolfpack women's cross country runners